Robert Norman Reiner (born March 6, 1947) is an American actor and filmmaker. As an actor, Reiner first came to national prominence with the role of Michael "Meathead" Stivic on the CBS sitcom All in the Family (1971–1979), a performance that earned him two Primetime Emmy Awards.

As a director, Reiner was recognized by the Directors Guild of America Awards with nominations for the coming of age drama Stand by Me (1986), the romantic comedy When Harry Met Sally... (1989), and the military courtroom drama A Few Good Men (1992), the last of which also earned him a nomination for the Academy Award for Best Picture. He has also received four nominations for the Golden Globe Award for Best Director.

Reiner's other major directorial film credits include the heavy metal mockumentary This Is Spinal Tap (1984), the romantic comedy fantasy adventure The Princess Bride (1987), the psychological horror-thriller Misery (1990), the romantic comedy-drama The American President (1995), the buddy comedy-drama The Bucket List (2007), and the biographical political drama LBJ (2016).

Reiner also appeared in a number of his films and various others, including Throw Momma from the Train (1987), Sleepless in Seattle (1993), Bullets Over Broadway (1994), The First Wives Club (1996), Primary Colors (1998), EDtv (1999), and The Wolf of Wall Street (2013).

Early life 
Reiner was born into a Jewish family in the Bronx, New York, on March 6, 1947. His parents were Estelle Reiner (née Lebost; 1914–2008), an actress, and Carl Reiner (1922–2020), a renowned comedian, actor, writer, producer and director. As a child, Reiner lived at 48 Bonnie Meadow Road in New Rochelle, New York; the home of the fictional Petrie family in The Dick Van Dyke Show, created by Rob's father, was 148 Bonnie Meadow Lane. He studied at the UCLA Film School.

Career 

In the early 1960s Reiner served as a trainee/apprentice at the Bucks County Playhouse in New Hope, Pennsylvania. In the late 1960s, Reiner acted in bit roles in several television shows including Batman, That Girl, The Andy Griffith Show, Room 222, Gomer Pyle, U.S.M.C. and The Beverly Hillbillies. During this time he also appeared in several films, including some by his father such as Where's Poppa? (1970). He began his career writing for the Smothers Brothers Comedy Hour in 1968 and 1969, with Steve Martin as his writing partner as the two youngest writers on the show.

Two years later, Reiner became famous playing Michael Stivic, Archie Bunker's liberal son-in-law, on Norman Lear's 1970s situation comedy All in the Family, which was the most-watched television program in the United States for five seasons (1971–1976). The character's nickname, "Meathead", (given to him by his cantankerous father-in-law Archie) became closely associated with him, even after he had left the role and went on to build a career as a director. Reiner has stated, "I could win the Nobel Prize and they'd write 'Meathead wins the Nobel Prize'." For his performance, Reiner won two Emmy Awards, in addition to three other nominations, and five Golden Globe nominations. After an extended absence, Reiner returned to television acting with a recurring role on New Girl (2012–2018).

In 1971, on The Partridge Family S02, E03 A man called Snake; which aired Oct 08, 1971, he played the character Snake. In 1972, Reiner, Phil Mishkin, and Gerry Isenberg created the situation comedy The Super for ABC. Starring Richard S. Castellano, the show depicted the life of the harried Italian American superintendent of a New York City apartment building and ran for 10 episodes in the summer of 1972. Reiner and Mishkin co-wrote the premiere episode.

Beginning in the 1980s, Reiner became known as a director of several successful Hollywood films that spanned many different genres. Some of his earlier films include cult classics such as the rock-band mockumentary This Is Spinal Tap (1984) and the comedic fantasy film The Princess Bride (1987), as well as his period piece coming of age tale Stand by Me (1986). He often collaborates with film editor Robert Leighton, whom he also shares with fellow director-actor Christopher Guest as their go-to editor.

Reiner has gone on to direct other critically and commercially successful films with his own company, Castle Rock Entertainment. These include the romantic comedy When Harry Met Sally... (1989), which has been critically ranked among the all-time best of its genre, the tense thriller Misery (1990), for which Kathy Bates won the Academy Award for Best Actress, and his most commercially successful work, the military courtroom drama A Few Good Men (1992), which was nominated for the Academy Award for Best Picture. Subsequent films directed by Reiner include the political romance The American President (1995), the courtroom drama Ghosts of Mississippi (1996), and the uplifting comedy The Bucket List (2007).

Reiner has continued to act in supporting roles in a number of films and television shows, including Throw Momma from the Train (1987), Sleepless in Seattle (1993), Bullets over Broadway (1994), The First Wives Club (1996), Primary Colors (1998), EDtv (1999), New Girl (2012–2018), and The Wolf of Wall Street (2013). He has also parodied himself with cameos in works such as Dickie Roberts: Former Child Star (2003), and 30 Rock (2010).

Political views 

Reiner has devoted considerable time and energy to liberal activism. His lobbying as an anti-smoking advocate, in particular, prompted his likeness to be used in a satirical role in a South Park episode titled "Butt Out".

Reiner is a co-founder of the American Foundation for Equal Rights, which initiated the court challenge against California Proposition 8 that banned same-sex marriage in the state.

In 1998, Reiner chaired the campaign to pass Prop 10, the California Children and Families Initiative, which created First 5 California, a program of early childhood development services, funded by a tax on tobacco products. He served as the first chairman of First 5 California, from 1999 to 2006. Reiner came under criticism for campaigning for a ballot measure (Prop 82) to fund state-run preschools while still chair of the First Five Commission, causing him to resign from his position on March 29, 2006. An audit was conducted, and it concluded that the state commission did not violate state law and that it had clear legal authority to conduct its public advertising campaigns related to preschool. Prop 82 failed to win approval, garnering only 39.1% support.

Reiner is a member of the Social Responsibility Task Force, an organization advocating moderation where social issues (such as violence and tobacco use) and the entertainment industry meet. He is also active in environmental issues, and he successfully led the effort to establish California's Ahmanson Ranch as a state park and wildlife refuge rather than as a commercial real estate development. He introduced Spinal Tap at the London Live Earth concert in July 2007.

Reiner was mentioned as a possible candidate to run against California Governor Arnold Schwarzenegger in 2006 but decided not to run for personal reasons. He campaigned extensively for Democratic presidential nominee Al Gore in the 2000 presidential election, and he campaigned in Iowa for Democratic presidential candidate Howard Dean just before the 2004 Iowa caucuses. He endorsed Hillary Clinton for president for the 2008 election. In 2015, he donated US$10,000 to Correct the Record, a political action committee that supported Hillary Clinton's 2016 presidential campaign. Since the 2016 election, he has continued to campaign against Donald Trump, calling him racist, sexist, anti-gay, and anti-Semitic, and he compared him to the Nazi police at Auschwitz. Reiner said that Harvey Weinstein is a "bad guy" but Trump is "also an abuser".

Reiner serves on the advisory board of the Committee to Investigate Russia. He and David Frum launched the site in September 2017 with Morgan Freeman warning people that "We are at war" and that Russia has attacked the United States. Others on the committee's advisory board at the time of launch included James Clapper, Max Boot, Charles Sykes, and Norman Ornstein. Additionally, in early November 2020, the advisory board included Evelyn Farkas, Michael Hayden, Michael Morrell, Leon Panetta, and Clint Watts.

Reiner endorsed Joe Biden for president for the 2020 election.

In June 2021, Reiner said that he was working on a 10- to 13-episode TV project covering the relationship between Vladimir Putin and Donald Trump. The project, he said, would cover the leaders' childhoods up until the point where their lives cross. Reiner said he's working with writer Ward Parry on the project, which he is calling "The Spy and the Asset".

Personal life 
Rob Reiner married actress/director Penny Marshall in 1971. He adopted Marshall's daughter, actress Tracy Reiner (A League of Their Own), from a previous marriage to Michael Henry. Reiner and Marshall divorced in 1981.

Reiner was introduced to his future wife, photographer Michele Singer, while directing When Harry Met Sally. The meeting not only resulted in his decision to change the ending of that film, but he also married Singer in 1989. They have three children, Jake (born 1991), Nick (born 1993), and Romy (born 1997). In 1997, Reiner and Singer founded the "I Am Your Child Foundation", and in 2004, they founded the "Parents' Action for Children", a non-profit organization with a dual purpose: a) to raise awareness of the importance of a child's early years by producing and distributing celebrity-hosted educational videos for parents, and b) to advance public policy through parental education and advocacy.

Reiner has stated that his childhood home was not observantly Jewish, although he did have a bar mitzvah ceremony; Reiner's father Carl acknowledged that he himself had become an atheist as the Holocaust progressed. Rob identified himself as having no religious affiliation on the January 13, 2012, episode of Real Time with Bill Maher and as an atheist. Reiner later told Huffington Post contributor Debra Oliver that while he rejected organized religion, he was sympathetic to the ideas of Buddhism.

In addition to his four children, Reiner has five grandchildren, through his adopted daughter Tracy.

Filmography

Film

As actor

Television 
TV writer

TV movies

As actor

Awards and nominations 
Television

Film

See also 
 Directors with three films rated A+ by CinemaScore

References

External links 

 
 
 
 Rob Reiner Archive of American Television Interview
 American Foundation for Equal Rights
 Parents Action for Children
 
 The films of Rob Reiner, Hell Is for Hyphenates, October 31, 2013

1947 births
20th-century American male actors
21st-century American male actors
Activists from California
Activists from New Rochelle, New York
Anti-smoking activists
Jewish American atheists
American bloggers
Film producers from California
American male film actors
American male television actors
American people of Romanian-Jewish descent
Beverly Hills High School alumni
Comedy film directors
Parody film directors
American parodists
Early childhood education in the United States
Film directors from New York City
Hugo Award winners
Jewish American male comedians
Jewish American male actors
American LGBT rights activists
Living people
Male actors from Beverly Hills, California
Male actors from New York City
New York (state) Democrats
Outstanding Performance by a Supporting Actor in a Comedy Series Primetime Emmy Award winners
Male actors from New Rochelle, New York
People from the Bronx
UCLA Film School alumni
Film directors from Los Angeles
Film producers from New York (state)
Comedians from California
20th-century American comedians
21st-century American comedians
American male bloggers
American people of Austrian-Jewish descent
Reiner family
American democracy activists
American independent film production company founders